These are the official results of the Women's marathon event at the 1994 European Championships in Helsinki, Finland. The race was held on 7 August 1994.

Medalists

Abbreviations
All times shown are in hours:minutes:seconds

Startlist

Intermediates

Final ranking

Participation
According to an unofficial count, 51 athletes from 16 countries participated in the event.

 (2)
 (6)
 (5)
 (1)
 (1)
 (6)
 (1)
 (5)
 (1)
 (4)
 (6)
 (1)
 (4)
 (1)
 (1)
 (6)

See also
 1992 Men's Olympic Marathon (Barcelona)
 1994 European Marathon Cup

References

External links
 Results
 marathonspiegel

Marathon
Marathons at the European Athletics Championships
1994 marathons
Women's marathons
European Athletics Championships marathon
Marathons in Finland